Thingoe North Division is an electoral division in Suffolk which returns one county councillor to Suffolk County Council. Its made up of the villages surrounding the Northern half of Bury St Edmunds and consists of the West Suffolk council wards of The Fornhams & Great Barton, Pakenham & Troston, and Risby excluding the parish of Icklingham which is part of Row Heath Division.

Parishes
The division is made up of 18 civil parishes plus the Western half of Honington.
Ampton
Culford
Flempton
Fornham All Saints
Fornham St Genevieve
Fornham St Martin
Great Barton
Great Livermere
Hengrave
Honington excluding the Eastern part of the parish which falls in the Blackbourne Division 
Ingham
Lackford
Little Livermere
Pakenham
Risby
Timworth
Troston
West Stow
Wordwell

Election Results
The division has been held by Conservative party since its formation at the 1985 United Kingdom local elections.

2017

2013

2009

2005

2001

1997

1993

1989

1985

References

Electoral Divisions of Suffolk